Hypogomphia is a genus of flowering plants in the mint family, Lamiaceae, first described in 1873. It is native to Iran, Afghanistan, and Central Asia.

Species
Hypogomphia bucharica Vved. - Tajikistan
Hypogomphia purpurea (Regel) Vved. ex Kochk. - Tajikistan
Hypogomphia turkestana Bunge - Tajikistan, Kyrgyzstan, Uzbekistan, Afghanistan, Iran

References

Lamiaceae
Lamiaceae genera
Taxa named by Alexander von Bunge